The 2019 Hawaii Bowl was a college football bowl game played on December 24, 2019, with kickoff at 8:00 p.m. EST (3:00 p.m. local HST) on ESPN. It was the 18th edition of the Hawaii Bowl, and was one of the 2019–20 bowl games concluding the 2019 FBS football season. Sponsored by the SoFi personal finance company, the game was officially known as the SoFi Hawaii Bowl.

Teams
The game was played between Hawaii of the Mountain West Conference, and BYU, an FBS independent. This was the 32nd meeting in this rivalry that dates back to 1930, and first in the postseason. Both teams were previously members of the Western Athletic Conference; BYU from 1962 to 1998, and Hawaii from 1979 to 2011. BYU led the rivalry series, 23–8.

Hawaii Rainbow Warriors

Hawaii entered the bowl with a 9–5 record (5–3 in conference). The Rainbow Warriors finished atop the West Division of the Mountain West Conference, with the same conference win–loss record as San Diego State, whom they defeated during the regular season. Hawaii accepted their bowl invitation following their loss to Boise State in the Mountain West Conference Football Championship Game. This was their third Hawaii Bowl appearance under head coach Nick Rolovich, having won in 2016 and lost in 2018. Overall, this was the 13th bowl game for Hawaii (ninth Hawaii Bowl), with a prior record of 6–6 (4–4 in prior Hawaii Bowls).

BYU Cougars

BYU entered the bowl with a 7–5 record, having started the season 2–4, then winning five consecutive games, and losing to San Diego State in their regular season finale. Led by head coach Kalani Sitake, the Cougars accepted an invitation to the Hawaii Bowl on November 16. This was BYU's first Hawaii Bowl appearance, and their second postseason game in Honolulu; they played in the 1992 Aloha Bowl, where they fell to Kansas by three points.

Game summary

Statistics

Notes

References

External links

Game program via issuu.com
Game statistics at statbroadcast.com

Hawaii Bowl
Hawaii Bowl
Hawaii Bowl
Hawaii Bowl
BYU Cougars football bowl games
Hawaii Rainbow Warriors football bowl games